The James Williams House is a historic home and farm complex located at Kenton, Kent County, Delaware.  The house was built in 1848, and is a two-story, five bay, center hall plan brick dwelling with Greek Revival details. It has a rear wing.  The front facade features a three-bay porch with chamfered posts and sawn decorative brackets dated to the 1880s.  Also on the property are a contributing barn, granary, and outhouse.

It was listed on the National Register of Historic Places in 1983.

References

Farms on the National Register of Historic Places in Delaware
Federal architecture in Delaware
Houses completed in 1848
Houses in Kent County, Delaware
Kenton, Delaware
National Register of Historic Places in Kent County, Delaware